Steijn van Heijningen (born 28 January 1997) is a Dutch field hockey who plays as a midfielder for Hoofdklasse club HGC and the Dutch national team.

Career

Club hockey
In the Dutch Hoofdklasse, Van Heijningen plays for HC Rotterdam.

National teams

Under–21
Steijn van Heijningen made his debut for the national junior team in 2016 during a four-nations tournament in Hannover. Later that year he went on to represent the team at the FIH Junior World Cup in Lucknow, finishing in seventh place.

Following his debut, Van Heijningen returned to the junior national team in 2017 for the EuroHockey Junior Championship in Valencia, Spain. At the tournament he won a gold medal.

Oranje
Van Heijningen made his senior debut for the Oranje in 2021 during season three of the FIH Pro League.

He was officially named in the national senior squad in 2022.

References

External links
 
 

1997 births
Living people
Dutch male field hockey players
Male field hockey midfielders
Men's Hoofdklasse Hockey players
HGC players
2023 Men's FIH Hockey World Cup players
20th-century Dutch people
21st-century Dutch people